= Inverse number =

An inverse number may refer to:

- The multiplicative inverse of a number
- A type of grammatical number
